This page lists the World Best Year Performances in the year 1989 in the hammer throw for both men and women.

Men

Records

1989 World Year Ranking

Women

1989 World Year Ranking

References
digilander.libero
apulanta
hammerthrow.wz

1989
Hammer Throw Year Ranking, 1989